Antonio Rivas may refer to:
 Antonio Rivas Mercado (1853-1927), Mexican architect
 Antonio Rivas (musician) (born 1949), Colombian accordion player
 Antonio Rivas (Colombian footballer) (born 1951), Colombian former footballer
 Antonio Rivas (Spanish footballer) (born 1965), Spanish coach and retired footballer